Trinity Episcopal Church is a historic Episcopal church on NY 23, southwest of the junction with Co. Rd. 19 in Ashland, Greene County, New York.  It was built in 1879 and is a one-story, three by three bay, wood-frame structure clad with board and batten siding in the Gothic Revival style.  It features a three-story entry / bell tower.

It was added to the National Register of Historic Places in 1996.

References

Episcopal church buildings in New York (state)
Churches on the National Register of Historic Places in New York (state)
Carpenter Gothic church buildings in New York (state)
Churches completed in 1879
19th-century Episcopal church buildings
Churches in Greene County, New York
National Register of Historic Places in Greene County, New York